

Background 
The term for the post of president in Hungary is 5 years. After the 2 consecutive terms of the previous office holder, Árpád Göncz, the succession was somewhat problematic. Though the coalition partner in the first cabinet of Viktor Orbán had its own candidate, party chairman József Torgyán, the leading party wanted another person. In the end Torgyán withdrew from the process.

The voting process 
An indirect election was held on 5–6 June 2000. The only candidate was legal scholar Ferenc Mádl, who was nominated formally by FKGP but with the support of the leading party. The opposition parties did not nominate any candidates.

After three rounds, Mádl was elected President of Hungary, taking the office on 4 August in that year.

First and second rounds
In the first two rounds, two-thirds majority requirement needed to elect the president, according to the Constitution.

Results

References

2000
Hungary
2000 in Hungary
June 2000 events in Europe